A sleeper (US English) or Q-car (British English) is a car that has high performance and an unassuming exterior. Sleeper cars are so called because their exterior looks similar or identical to a standard or economy-class car. In some cases the car appears worse due to seeming neglect on the owner's part, typically referred to as "all go and no show".  While appearing to be a standard or neglected car, internally they are modified to have higher performance levels.  The American nomenclature comes from the term sleeper agent, while the British term derives from the Q-ships used by the Royal Navy.

In the February 1963  Motor Sport magazine editor Bill Boddy said "the modifications carried out by Lotus have turned the Lotus Cortina into a 'Q' car par excellence". The British film The Long Arm (1956; aka The Third Key) mentions a Q-car (unmarked) patrolling the city by night, indicating that the term was in use among UK law enforcement at least a decade earlier.

In July 1964, British magazine Motorcycle Mechanics carried an announcement from editor Bill Lawless of the use of two unmarked police "Q-cars" – a black Daimler SP250 sports car and a green Austin A40 Farina – patrolling the A20 road between London and Maidstone, Kent.

Beginnings in the West

The Chrysler 300 letter series began in 1955 with the Chrysler C-300. These cars were among the first sleepers, marketed as high-end luxury cars from the traditional luxury marque Chrysler, but with a high-end homologation racing engine. However, these cars lose their "sleeper value" due to both their rarity (this series was highly luxurious; it was made in limited numbers and examples are very expensive), and the well publicized successes of Carl Kiekhaefer in NASCAR racing (1955–1956); though the model is an important precursor of the muscle car.

The 1968 Mercedes-Benz 300SEL 6.3 was a powerful sedan with a subdued exterior.  A trend of overtly powerful saloon cars with subtle body modifications is exemplified by the work of Mercedes-AMG and Brabus on unassuming Mercedes saloons.

The 1986 Lancia Thema 8.32, fitted with a Ferrari V8 engine, has been described by Road & Track as "one of the weirder sleepers to come out of the 1980s".

The car which is most often credited  as the start of the production Q-car trend in Europe is the 1990 Lotus Omega, which started out as an Opel Omega/Vauxhall Carlton.

In the Soviet Union
The first Q-car was invented by the Soviet NKVD in 1938, when imported Ford flathead V8 engines were installed on GAZ M-1 cars. After WWII they were replaced by GAZ M-20G cars equipped with adapted powertrain from GAZ-12 ZIM and special-purpose equipment. Those, as well as their successors, were available either in black color (or possibly GAI road police livery) for the security details of the KGB's 9th Directorate or in common colors for the surveillance teams of the 7th Directorate. After the M-20 was discontinued, 603 GAZ-23 cars were produced in 1962-1970, combining modified GAZ-21 body with slanted GAZ-13 engine and transmission, better brakes and KGB equipment. They were followed by similar GAZ-24 modifications: GAZ-24-24, -25, -34 and -35, over 2000 mostly produced during 1970s and 1980s. GAZ-31012 and 31013 based on the GAZ-3102 were only produced in black in very small numbers (~300) starting from 1985. In Post-Soviet Russia the practice was discontinued, with special services acquiring imported cars.

Owner-modified cars
Some vehicle owners create sleepers by swapping more powerful engines, or making other performance modifications, like adding a supercharger or turbocharger, leaving the external appearance as it came from the factory. Sometimes hints of the car's true nature are visible: wider tires, a lower stance, or a different engine tone or exhaust note. Gauges and instrumentation are often kept to a minimum. Some owners go as far as to use weight reduction techniques employed by other performance enthusiasts, removing items not fundamental to street racing, such as rear seats, trim, spare tire, air conditioner, power steering, or heater; bumpers and headlights may also be replaced with lighter items.

References 

Modified vehicles